Heaven's Artillery: March Two Step is a war song composed by Harry J. Lincoln. The song was produced by Vandersloot Music Publishing Company in 1904.

The sheet music can be found at the Pritzker Military Museum & Library.

Copyrights
Heaven's Artillery: March Two Step was entered into the Canadian Patent Office Records on May 19th, 1904.

References

External links
 View the song MP3 and the sheet music here.

Songs about soldiers
1904 songs
Songs written by Harry J. Lincoln